Kalmar Wing, also F 12 Kalmar, or simply F 12, is a former Swedish Air Force wing with the main base located on the south-east coast of Sweden.

History
The wing started out with three squadrons of B 17C in 1942.

In 1947, F 12 was converted to a fighter wing by replacing the light bombers with the J 21A-2 which were upgraded to -3 before they were obsolete.

Through 1952 to 1953, the three wings replaced the J 21's with J 29As  which were only kept for five years until they were replaced by the J 32B Lansen in 1958. However, one of the squadrons were decommissioned after only two years.

In 1962, the Air Force Meteorology School moved to F 12 Kalmar from F 2 Hägernäs.

The two squadrons were upgraded to J 35F in 1968 which were kept until the decommissioning of the wing in 1980.

The base with the meteorology school continued to operate under the F 17K name as a detachment to Blekinge Wing (F 17) until 1983 when the school moved to the Swedish Air Force Flying School.

The airfield has been used for general and commercial aviation as Kalmar Airport  since 1980.

Heraldry and traditions

Coat of arms
Blazon: "Argent, the town badge of Kalmar, from a waved base azure a tower embattled gules, gate and window or issuant between two etoiles gules."

Colours, standards and guidons
A colour was presented to the wing on 17 September 1944 at F 8 in Barkarby by His Majesty the King Gustaf V. The colour is preserved at Blekinge Wing. Blazon: "On blue cloth in the centre the badge of the Air Force; a winged two-bladed propeller under a royal crown proper. In the first corner from a waved base a yellow tower embattled issuant between two mullets".

March
”Kalmar flygflottiljs marsch” was composed by Bo Hartog, the wing's music director. It has not been officially established.

Commanding officers
Commanding officers from 1942 to 1980. The commanding officer was referred to as flottiljchef ("wing commander") and had the rank of colonel. From 1976 to 1978, the wing commander was referred to as sektorflottiljchef ("sector wing commander"). The deputy sector wing commander was sometimes referred to as wing commander.

1942–1954: Ragnar Carlgren
1954–1966: Thomas Stålhandske
1966–1970: Gunnar Rissler
1970–1972: Carl-Gustaf Simmons
1972–1980: Fritz Crona

Names, designations and locations

See also
 Swedish Air Force
 List of military aircraft of Sweden

Footnotes

References

Notes

Print

Web

Further reading

Wings of the Swedish Air Force
Military units and formations established in 1942
Military units and formations disestablished in 1980
1942 establishments in Sweden
1980 disestablishments in Sweden
Disbanded units and formations of Sweden